Smile was a magazine aimed at teenage girls. The magazine was started in 1998. At first it was supposed to be a mainstream teen mag similar to Seventeen, but with added manga; later, it became more focused on manga and removed most of its other features. It was published by Tokyopop based in Los Angeles. The magazine was discontinued in 2002. 

Sailor Moon, Peach Girl, and Juline were serialized in the magazine. Sailor Moon was originally serialized in MixxZine but Mixx moved it to Smile because Mixx wanted to refocus MixxZine towards high school and university/college-aged readers. Smile serialized the SuperS story arc, while earlier story arcs not finished in MixxZine were finished in individual comic book publications.

See also

List of manga magazines published outside of Japan

References

External links
 Smile (Archive)
 Full Circle: The Unofficial History of MixxZine

1998 establishments in California
2002 disestablishments in California
Anime and manga magazines
Defunct magazines published in the United States
Magazines disestablished in 2002
Magazines established in 1998
Magazines published in Los Angeles
Teen magazines
Tokyopop titles